At the 1988 Summer Olympics in Seoul a total number of 42 events in athletics were contested: 24 by men and 18 by women. There were a total number of 1617 participating athletes from 149 countries.

Medal summary

Men

Women

 * = Athletes who ran in preliminary rounds and also received medals.

Medal table

See also
1988 in athletics (track and field)

References

External links
 Athletics at the 1988 Seoul Summer Games. Sports Reference. Retrieved on 2011-12-04.
 Australia Athletics

 
1988
1988 Summer Olympics events
O